The 1983 Leicester City Council election took place on 5 May 1983 to elect members of Leicester City Council in England. This was on the same day as other local elections.

Following this election, the council briefly moved from all-out to staggered council elections for the 1984 and 1986 elections.

Summary

|}

References

Leicester
Leicester City Council elections
1980s in Leicestershire